John Ros, 7th Baron Ros of Helmsley (c.1397 – 22 March 1421) was an English nobleman.

He was the eldest son of William Ros, 6th Baron Ros, and Margaret Fitzalan (d. 3 July 1438), the daughter of John FitzAlan, 1st Baron Arundel, by Eleanor Maltravers (d. 3 July 1438), younger daughter and coheir of Sir John Maltravers.

He served as a soldier of Henry V of England during the Hundred Years' War. Six years after the Battle of Agincourt, John participated in the Battle of Baugé. He was among the casualties along with his brother William Ros, Thomas of Lancaster, Duke of Clarence, the governor of Normandy and others. He was buried at the Belvoir Priory.

Marriage
John de Ros married Margery le Despencer, daughter and heiress of Philip le Despencer, 2nd Baron le Despencer, but had no issue by her. After his death, Margery married Roger Wentworth (d. 24 October 1452), esquire, younger son of John Wentworth of Elmsall, Yorkshire, by whom she had issue. She was fined £1000 for having contracted a dishonourable marriage far beneath her station.

Footnotes

References

Ancestry

Ros, John, 7th Baron
07
Ros, John, 7th Baron
Ros, John, 7th Baron
Ros, John, 7th Baron
Year of birth unknown
Year of birth uncertain